Swafford may refer to:

 Howard G. Swafford (1919–2016), American politician
 Hudson Swafford (born September 9, 1987), American professional golfer
 Jan Swafford (born September 10, 1946), American composer and author
 Martina Swafford (pen name "Belle Bremer"; 1845–1913), American poet